Abdi Nageeye (born 2 March 1989) is a Somali-Dutch long-distance runner from the Netherlands. He won the silver medal in the marathon at the 2020 Tokyo Olympics. Nageeye placed third at the 2022 New York City Marathon.

He is the Dutch national record holder for the 10 km road race, half marathon and marathon.

Early life
Nageeye was born on 2 March 1989 in Mogadishu, Somalia. At the age of 6, he was resettled as a refugee in the Netherlands. After spending four years in the Netherlands, he then lived with his family in Syria and Somalia. Afterwards, Nageeye returned to the Netherlands via Ethiopia and was adopted by a family in Oldebroek.

Nageeye is fluent in Somali, Dutch, Arabic, English, and Amharic.

Career
Nageeye finished eighth at the 2016 Boston Marathon. Later that year, he finished 11th at the Olympic marathon in Rio. In 2018, he competed in the men's marathon at the 2018 European Athletics Championships held in Berlin, Germany. He did not finish his race.

He has also trained in Kenya.

Nageeye is currently part of the NN Running Team, an international team of elite long-distance runners managed by Global Sports Communication in Nijmegen, Netherlands.

Nageeye won the silver medal in the 2020 Tokyo Olympic marathon, finishing in a season's best time of 2:09:58.

In April 2022, he won his first marathon at the Rotterdam Marathon in a time of 2:04:56, slicing more than a minute off the Dutch record which he set in the same city in 2019.

Competition record

International competitions

National titles
 Dutch Athletics Championships
 5000 metres: 2012

Personal bests
 10 kilometres – 28:08 (Brunssum 2013) 
 Half marathon – 1:00:24 (Marugame 2019) 
 Marathon – 2:04:56 (Rotterdam 2022)

References

External links
 
 
 
 
 

Living people
1989 births
Naturalised citizens of the Netherlands
Dutch male long-distance runners
Dutch male marathon runners
Olympic athletes of the Netherlands
Athletes (track and field) at the 2016 Summer Olympics
Athletes (track and field) at the 2020 Summer Olympics
Olympic silver medalists in athletics (track and field)
Olympic silver medalists for the Netherlands
Medalists at the 2020 Summer Olympics
Somalian male long-distance runners
Somalian refugees
Somalian emigrants to the Netherlands